Eurosia costinota is a moth of the family Erebidae first described by Alfred Ernest Wileman. It is found on Mindanao in the Philippines.

References

Nudariina